Naphthol Green B is a coordination complex of iron that is used as a dye.

Structure
Naphthol Green B is the sodium salt of Naphthol Green Y (C.I. 10005). The organic ligands each bind to iron as bidentate ligands through the nitrogen and the anionic phenoxide groups.  Three ligands are bound to the iron.

Applications
Its absorption maximum is 714 nm in water. It is water-soluble.

Naphthol Green B is used in histology to stain collagen. Moreover, it is used for polychrome stains with animal tissue. For industry purposes Naphthol Green B is used for staining wool, nylon, paper, anoxidized aluminium and soap.

References

External links
 Naphthol Green B at StainsFile

Nitroso compounds
Iron(III) compounds
Naphthalenesulfonates
Organic sodium salts
Iron complexes
Acid dyes